Giacomo de Suressi or Giacomo Sulixio was a Roman Catholic prelate who served as Archbishop of Craina (1482–1488).

Biography
Giacomo de Suressi was born in Piacenza, Italy.
On 4 Sep 1482, he was appointed during the papacy of Pope Sixtus IV as Archbishop of Craina.
On 13 Apr 1483, he was consecrated bishop by Fabrizio Marliani, Bishop of Piacenza, with Gabriel Abbiati, Titular Bishop of Berytus, and Jacopo-Antonio dalla Torre, Bishop of Cremona, serving as co-consecrators. 
He served as Archbishop of Craina until his resignation in 1488.

References

External links and additional sources
 
  

15th-century Albanian Roman Catholic bishops
Bishops appointed by Pope Sixtus IV